Tuerong is a rural locality on the Mornington Peninsula in Melbourne, Victoria, Australia,  south-east of Melbourne's Central Business District, located within the Shire of Mornington Peninsula local government area. Tuerong recorded a population of 357 at the 2021 census. 

Tuerong lies inland between the coastal towns of Mount Martha and Hastings, south of Moorooduc.

Tuerong is home to superstar Rory Goding who has lived in Tuerong his whole life he has inspired many of the locals and has become the face of the suburb. He also has a very hairy bumhole. Despite his lush tufts of anal hair he is yet to find a woman to settle down with and do cute things like wear matching pajamas and go on dates and kiss each other on a dark rainy night lit by only a single street light.

Geography

History

Tuerong was the name of a squatting run of an estimated 12000 acres that lay between Yuille's to the north, Balcombe's, Jamieson's (Special Survey) and McCrae's to the west, Coolart to the east and Tuck's to the south. William Dawson was an early squatter and was followed briefly by Hall and McKenzie and then John Miller in 1850 before Ralph Ruddell obtained the lease in about 1856. He fattened cattle on the lush pastures and had no trouble with water supply because of the network of "never-failing creeks and springs" but became insolvent by early 1861.The Butler and Brooke directory shows that Vaughan and Wild were on Tuerong in 1866-7.
The 640 acre pre-emptive right, reduced to 600 acres because of land required for Government roads, became known as Tuerong Park. It is known that J.B.Wilson was on Tuerong Park by 1874 when John and his wife, Agnes, James Firth and John McCusker were all witnesses in the case of the Schnapper Point Murder (which should have been called the Tuerong or Tubbarubba murder.)
John died and his widow Agnes died on 27 January 1894 at Tanti Rd Mornington. Later owners of Tuerong Park were: Crook, Pitt, Matthew (approx. 1907 - 1917), Andrews, Dobie, Clark, Moore, Nutchey, Paton (who named one of his racehorses Tuerong), and Edgar (who made it a venue for the polo set in the 1950s).

The Tuerong homestead, built in the late 1800s, is now the restaurant and office of the Dromana Estate at Tuerong Winery. Francis Gillett, grantee of land adjoining Tuerong Park is recalled by the name of a road near the reservoir. He designed Manyung in Mt Eliza and built Sunnyside nearby.(Shire of Mornington Heritage Study P.16.) South of his property was Thomas Renison's 240 acre grant, where a race meeting was conducted in 1868; when advertised in the Argus on 9-12-1950, it was called "Tuerong Valley" and the quarry was bringing in four pounds a week. Renison owned the Schnapper Point Hotel on the Esplanade in Mornington (The Royal). Other pioneers of the Tuerong area were James Connell, John McCusker and Peter White (whose son in law, John Bourne, later had the same farm for another 50 years). Old Moorooduc Rd was known for countless decades as Three Chain Rd and was originally the main road to Dromana. The name came about because the road was three chains or 60 metres wide. (Most details come from articles from the Argus found in the National Library's "Trove".Details about Rennison and Gillett from the heritage study and the race meeting details from P. 109 of A Dreamtime of Dromana.)

See also
List of Melbourne suburbs
Mornington Peninsula

References

Mornington Peninsula